Villanova University's Charles Widger School of Law (known as Villanova University School of Law) is a law school of the Villanova University in Villanova, Pennsylvania.

Opened in 1953, the School of Law is approved by the American Bar Association (ABA) and is a member of the Association of American Law Schools (AALS). Approximately 720 students study full-time in the J.D. program which offers more than 100 offerings including foundation courses, specialty offerings, drafting courses, clinical experiences, seminars, simulation courses and externships. The student/faculty ratio is 17:1.

In November 2007, the Villanova School of Law began construction on a new building to house classrooms, offices, and research facilities. The building was completed in August 2009. The new facility was built according to LEED standards and incorporate a park like setting with a walking trail.

Degrees awarded 
J.D.
J.D./M.B.A. with School of Business
J.D./LL.M. in Law and Taxation
J.D./LL.M. in International Law

Juris Doctor (JD) 
Villanova offers a legal education designed to teach the rules of law and their application; to demonstrate how lawyers analyze legal issues and express arguments and conclusions; to inculcate the skills of the counselor, advocate, and decision maker; and to explore the ethical and moral dimensions of law practice and professional conduct.

Joint JD/MBA program 
The Villanova University School of Law and the Villanova School of Business offer a joint-degree program permitting simultaneous study for the Juris Doctor and the Master of Business Administration degrees. The Villanova School of Business is one of the few business schools in the nation whose Master of Business Administration and Department of Accountancy program have been approved by the Association to Advance Collegiate Schools of Business. In the program, credit is given for certain courses by both the School of Law and the School of Business. Through this program, degrees may be completed in less time than it would take to obtain them separately.

Graduate Tax Program 
The Graduate Tax Program is an interdisciplinary program led by Leslie M. Book conducted under the auspices of the Villanova University School of Law and Villanova's School of Business. The program has over 30 courses, which are also available to JD candidates, who are able to enroll in LL.M. courses as well as participate in the joint JD/LL.M. program. Business students participating in the Graduate Tax Program may earn a Master of Science in Taxation (MST) degree.

Moorad Center for the Study of Sports Law 
The Jeffrey S. Moorad Center for the Study of Sports Law was created in 2012, and was funded by a $5 million donation from San Diego Padres vice chairman and CEO Jeffrey S. Moorad (a 1981 graduate of the law school). The Center prepares students for careers in sports-related fields. It is one of only a few in the United States dedicated to the study of sports law, and it is run by director Andrew Brandt, a lawyer, former NFL team executive, and ESPN commentator.

Special programs 
Beyond the skills of written and oral expression developed in the first-year writing program and the required upper-level moot court program, drafting, and seminar courses, Villanova University School of Law students acquire the fundamental skills of the practicing lawyer—including counseling, negotiation, advocacy, mediation, dispute resolution, conciliation, and mature judgment. Hands-on clinical opportunities allow students to apply classroom experiences to real-world client representation, often while performing public service. Clinical programs include Federal Tax; Civil Justice; Asylum, Refugee, and Emigrant Services; and Farmworkers Legal Aid.

The school also strives to provide leadership in information technology, law and psychology, taxation, and international law, among other fields.

Rankings and honors
The 2021 edition of U.S. News & World Reports "Best Graduate Schools" ranked Villanova Law at 53rd in the country overall.

The 2020 edition of Above the Law's Top 50 Law Schools ranked Villanova as the 32nd best law school in the country.

In 2015, the National Law Journal ranked Villanova Law as the #34 "Go-To" law school based on its employment statistics with the nation's largest law firms.

Class statistics 
Fall 2021 entering class profile:

 Total number of applicants: 2,972
 Admit rate: 17.8%
 Total enrolled: 219
 In-state: 45%
 Out-of-state: 55%
 Students of color: 24%
 Undergraduate schools represented: 125
GPA:
 Median GPA: 3.70
 25th percentile GPA: 3.51
 75th percentile GPA: 3.83
LSAT:
 Median LSAT: 162
 25th percentile LSAT: 157
 75th percentile LSAT: 164

Notable faculty
 Michelle Anderson (born 1967), President of Brooklyn College, and a scholar on rape law
 Edmund V. Ludwig
 John F. Murphy (emeritus law professor)

Notable alumni
 Frederick Anton III (law class of 1958), president and CEO of the Pennsylvania Manufactures Association and the Pennsylvania Manufactures Insurance Company
 Richard Arcara (law class of 1965), judge, United States District Court for the Western District of New York (1988–present; Chief Judge, 2003–2010)
 Adrienne Arsht, American philanthropist and banking executive (namesake of the Adrienne Arsht Center for the Performing Arts)
 Kelly Ayotte (law class of 1993), former Republican United States senator from New Hampshire (2011–2017); formerly New Hampshire Attorney General (2004–2009)
 Lewis R. Carluzzo (law class of 1974), special trial judge of the United States Tax Court
 J. Scot Chadwick (law class of 1978), former Republican member of the Pennsylvania House of Representatives (1985–2000)
 Mary Little Cooper (law class of 1972), federal judge on the United States District Court for the District of New Jersey (1992–present); formerly VP and General Counsel, Prudential Property and Casualty Insurance, Holmdel (1990–1992); Commissioner, New Jersey Department of Banking (1984–1990)
 Ryan Costello, former Chester County Commissioner and former member of the United States House of Representatives
 Craig Dally (law class of 1988), current judge for the 3rd District of the Northampton County Court of Common Pleas (2010–present); former member of the Pennsylvania House of Representatives for the 138th District (1996–2010)
 Joseph T. Doyle, Pennsylvania State Representative for the 163rd district (1971–1978)
 Bishop Michael Fitzgerald, auxiliary bishop of the Archdiocese of Philadelphia
 Dave Frankel, Philadelphia TV anchor
 Jacob Frey, former member of the Minneapolis City Council (2014–2018), Mayor of Minneapolis (2018–present)
 Charlie Gerow, Republican political strategist
 David F. Girard-diCarlo (law class of 1973), attorney and United States Ambassador to Austria (2008–2009); former Managing Partner and Chairman of Blank Rome
 William J. Green, III, former member of the United States House of Representatives (1964–1977); Mayor of Philadelphia (1980–1984)
 Joseph Hare, executive and retired rear admiral, US Navy
 Mark A. Kearney, United States district judge, United States District Court for the Eastern District of Pennsylvania (2014–present)
 Matthew F. McHugh, former member of the United States House of Representatives
 Jeff Moorad, owner, San Diego Padres
 Ed Rendell, former governor of Pennsylvania (2003–2011); former Mayor of Philadelphia (1992–1999)
 Marjorie Rendell, federal judge on the United States Court of Appeals for the Third Circuit (1997–present); former judge for the United States District Court for the Eastern District of Pennsylvania
 Matthew J. Ryan, former Speaker of the Pennsylvania House of Representatives
 William H. Ryan, Jr., Acting Attorney General of Pennsylvania (2011); formerly District Attorney of Delaware County (1988–1996)
 Jennifer Santiago (law class of 1987), Emmy Award-winning journalist
 Collins J. Seitz, Jr., justice of the Delaware Supreme Court
 Donald Snyder (law class of 1982), member of the Pennsylvania House of Representatives (1981–2000; Majority Whip 1997–2000)
 Michael J. Stack III (law class of 1992), 33rd and former lieutenant governor of Pennsylvania
Thomas J. Stapleton (law class of 1972), Pennsylvania State Representative for the 165th district (1975–1978)
 Gerald R. Stockman (law class of 1959), noted fair housing advocate and former New Jersey state senator (1982–1992)
 Michael Testa, New Jersey State Senator for the 1st Legislative district (2019–present)
 Richard Trumka, president of the AFL–CIO and former president of the United Mine Workers of America
 David Worby, trial lawyer known for advocacy on behalf of 9/11 workers
 John Waldron – American criminal defense lawyer
 Joanna McClinton - Pennsylvania House Speaker

Placement
According to Villanova's official 2014 ABA-required disclosures, 70% of the Class of 2014 obtained full-time, long-term, JD-required employment nine months after graduation, excluding solo practitioners.

Pro bono programs
Pro bono programs, such as the clinics and other projects, provide students with the opportunity to serve the disadvantaged while developing skills and positive relationships with practicing attorneys.

Lawyering Together
Villanova Law's student body has the opportunity to participate in the "Lawyering Together" program. Through the program, law students are matched with volunteer attorneys who assist clients referred through Philadelphia pro bono organizations. The referring organizations include Senior Law Center, Philadelphia Volunteers for the Indigent Program (VIP) and the Support Center for Child Advocates.

Recent Deans

Mark Sargent
Sargent graduated magna cum laude in 1973 from Wesleyan University, received an M.A. in medieval studies in 1975 from Cornell University, and graduated from Cornell Law School in 1978. He began teaching law in 1980, was the Piper & Marbury Professor of Law and Associate Dean for Academic Affairs and Director of the Law & Entrepreneurship Program at the University of Maryland Francis King Carey School of Law. He has also previously taught law at American University, Southern Methodist University, and the University of Baltimore School of Law.

In 2006, Sargent worked with Pepper Hamilton to launch a diversity initiative that included two full tuition scholarships for minority students and hiring two Villanova Law School minority students each year as first-year summer associates and then as part-time law clerks during their second or third academic years. In July 2009, Sargent resigned, citing medical and personal reasons. A week later, The Philadelphia Inquirer reported that Sargent was connected with the solicitation of prostitution, although he was never charged. In February 2011, Villanova's newly-appointed dean, John Gotanda, revealed that a Law School committee had determined that the under the leadership of the former Dean Mark Sargent, false statistical data including entrance LSAT scores had been reported to the American Bar Association about incoming students for several years before 2010. As a result, the American Bar Association issued a censure to the school A two-year probation was also issued by the AALS. Villanova began a comprehensive internal investigation and commissioned an independent audit by Ropes & Gray to determine the nature and scope of the false reporting.

John Gotanda
John Y. Gotanda became dean at Villanova University School of Law on January 1, 2011, after having previously served as the associate dean for academic affairs, associate dean for faculty research, and director of the J.D./M.B.A. Program. Gotanda received his J.D. from the William S. Richardson School of Law, where he was editor-in-chief of the University of Hawaii Law Review. Before coming to Villanova in 1994 he was a staff attorney with the United States Court of Appeals for the District of Columbia Circuit. He also worked as an associate attorney with Covington & Burling in Washington, D.C., and later with Goodwin Procter in Boston. In February 2016, Gotanda was named president of Hawaii Pacific University.

Mark Alexander
Mark C. Alexander became dean of the law school on July 1, 2016, due to Gotanda becoming president of Hawai‘i Pacific University. Alexander was previously the associate dean for Academics at Seton Hall School of Law. Prior to his Seton Hall University School of Law role, he clerked for Chief Judge Thelton Henderson of the United States District Court for the Northern District of California from 1992 to 1993 and was a litigator with Gibson Dunn in San Francisco from 1993 to 1995. Alexander earned both his Bachelor of Arts and Juris Doctor degrees from Yale University.

References

External links 
 School of Law site

Catholic law schools in the United States
Educational institutions established in 1953
Law schools in Pennsylvania
Villanova University
1953 establishments in Pennsylvania